Koonung Creek (or Koonung Koonung Creek) is a small tributary of the Yarra River in Melbourne's east.  The creek originates in Nunawading near Springvale Road, and flows to join the Yarra at the border between Ivanhoe East, Bulleen and Balwyn North.  The place the two waterways meet forms the borders between these suburbs.  Bushy Creek (now carried by an underground pipe) is a tributary to the creek, joining near Elgar Park in Mont Albert North. A shared use path follows the course of the creek (and therefore also the Freeway), known as the Koonung Creek Trail.

Melbourne Water rates the condition of the creek as 'Very Poor'.  Also according to Melbourne Water, the river is the unhealthiest waterway in Melbourne.  Melbourne Water's monitoring station for the creek at Bulleen Road in Bulleen, detected an average E. coli count of 1800, this is nine times the safe swimming level (200).  This was the highest level of E. coli measured in all of metropolitan Melbourne's waterways. The poor condition of the creek has been evident from the earliest days of European settlement.

Five species of frog call the creek home, these are the Common Eastern Froglet, the Spotted Marsh Frog, the Striped Marsh Frog, the Eastern or Pobblebonk Frog and the Southern Brown or Ewing's Tree Frog. The Eastern Freeway follows the path of the creek within the band of parkland that adjoins the creek over its entire length.

Geography
The creek's headwaters meet near the borders of Nunawading and Donvale, 21 km east of Melbourne. From here, the creek flows in a roughly westerly direction for around 11 km, before reaching the Yarra River below the Yarra Flats in southern Bulleen. The creek is joined by various gullies and creeks, the most prominent of the tributaries include; St Clems Gully, Bushy Creek and Gawler/Lungren Gully.

Geographic Features
Boronia Grove Wetlands
Doncaster Hill
Other various wetlands & billabongs

Settlements
Approximately 80-90,000 people live in the creek's catchment area. Most settlements are extensions of suburban areas down the Koonung Creek Valley, with Doncaster and Balwyn North being notable exceptions. The settlements located along its course are listed below, from downstream to upstream;
Southern Bulleen - 5,000~
Balwyn North - 20,000
Bellvue
Greythorn
Doncaster - 18,000
Mont Albert North - 5,000
Box Hill North - 10,000
Kerrimuir
Southern Doncaster East - 7,500~
Blackburn North - 6,800
Southern Donvale - 2,000~
Northern Nunawading - 5,000~

Crossings

 Freeway Golf Course Footbridge
 Bulleen Road
 Thompsons Road
 Eastern Freeway
 Doncaster Road (creek tunnel)
 Elgar Park Footbridge
 Elgar Road
 Tram Road
 Wetherby Road
 Eastern Freeway
 Boronia Grove Footbridges
 Blackburn Road (creek tunnel, 1995)
 Koonung Creek Park Footbridges
 Springvale Road
 Eastern Freeway

Other information
Koonung Creek lends its name to many things, including many local streets and roads;
Koonung Park, Blackburn North and the Koonung Park Tennis Centre
Koonung Road, Blackburn North
Koonung Creek Reserve
The Koonung Ward in the local government area of the City of Manningham
The Koonung Creek Trail
Koonung Secondary College
Koonung Heights Cricket Club

See also 
 Yarra River
 Mullum Mullum Creek
 Kooyongkoot Creek
 List of reduplicated Australian place names

References

External links
Melbourne Water Koonung Creek page
Warning plan on polluted Yarra - Article from The Age.

Melbourne Water catchment
Rivers of Greater Melbourne (region)
Tributaries of the Yarra River